The 1982 Wichita State Shockers football team was an American football team that represented  Wichita State as a member of the Missouri Valley Conference during the 1982 NCAA Division I-A football season. In their fourth year under head coach Willie Jeffries, the team compiled a 8–3 record. It would prove to be the final winning season for the Shocker football program. WSU would go 3-8 over each of the following four seasons before the university ended sponsorship of football following the 1986 campaign.

Schedule

References

Wichita State
Wichita State Shockers football seasons
Wichita State Shockers football